Doto bella is a species of sea slug, a nudibranch, a marine gastropod mollusc in the family Dotidae.

Distribution
This species was described from the Izu Peninsula, Japan. It is widely distributed on the Pacific Ocean coasts of Japan and the Japan Sea coasts. A species from Indonesia has previously been identified as Doto bella but is now thought to be an undescribed species.Rudman, W.B., 2001 (Apr 7). Comment on Doto from Indonesia by Tony Wu. [Message in] Sea Slug Forum. Australian Museum, Sydney.

Description

This nudibranch is transparent white with a diffuse, sub-epidermal layer of black pigment which is faint in some specimens and very dense in others. The ceratal tubercles are slightly stalked with globular tips which have a large black spot which is partly obscured by white glands in the terminal tubercle. The digestive gland is usually yellow. The outer half of the rhinophores is black.

EcologyDoto bella'' has been photographed on a colony of a hydroid, probably in the family Aglaopheniidae on which it presumably feeds.

References

Dotidae
Gastropods described in 1938